Robert Hawley (1729–1799), Captain, raised provisions for the Continental soldiers and fought in the American Revolutionary War.

Biography
Captain Robert Hawley was born June 5, 1726, in North Stratford, now Trumbull, Connecticut, in New England. He was the son of John Hawley, Esquire and Sarah Walker, the grandson of Captain John Hawley and great grandson of Joseph Hawley (Captain), the first of the name in America. On March 15, 1750, Hawley married Anna Beach, daughter of Lt. Josiah Beach and Patience Nichols, and raised nine children. The family lived in the house built by Robert's great uncle Ephraim Hawley on Nichols Avenue Route 108 at the south end of the village of Nichols Farms on land that had been in the Hawley family since 1670. Hawley gifted the house to his son Eliakim in January 1787 when he married his cousin Sally Sara Hawley. Captain Robert Hawley died in 1799.

Lawsuit

Military service
The Connecticut general assembly named Robert Hawley the Ensign of the North Stratford Train Band or Company of the 4th regiment of the Connecticut Colony militia in October 1765. He was promoted to Lieutenant in October 1769 and to Captain in May 1773. At a special meeting assembled in North Stratford on November 10, 1777 he was appointed to a committee to provide immediately all those necessaries for the Continental soldiers. On March 12, 1778, the parish of North Stratford made donations of provisions for those residents serving in the southern army stationed at Valley Forge, Pennsylvania under the command of General George Washington. George Washington called Connecticut the Provision State because of supplies contributed to his army by Governor Jonathan Trumbull the only Colonial Governor to support the cause of America's Independence from Great Britain. Three Hawley's from North Stratford served in the southern army during the winter of 1778; Abraham, Nathan and Nero. Nero Hawley was a slave owned by the Hawley family who won his freedom after fighting in the American Revolution. Robert Hawley and his sons; John, Edmund, and Robert, Jr. are listed in the rolls of soldiers who fought in the American Revolution from Stratford, CT.

See also
 A Great Jubilee Day
 Ephraim Hawley House

Notes
 William Richard Cutter, New England Families, Genealogical and Memorial, Lewis Historical Publishing, NY, 1914
 Elias Sill Hawley, The Hawley Record, Press of E. H. Hutchinson & Co., Buffalo NY, 1890
 Connecticut General Assembly, The Public Records of the Colony of Connecticut 1636-1776, Press of the Case Lockwood & Brainard, 1885
 Reverend Samuel Orcutt, History of Old Town of Stratford and the City of Bridgeport, Connecticut, Fairfield Historical Society, 1886
 William Howard Wilcoxson, History of Stratford Connecticut, 1639-1939, Higginson Book Company, 1997
 Royal R. Hinman, A Catalogue of the Names of the Early Puritan Settlers of the Colony of Connecticut, Press of Case, Tiffany and Company, Hartford, 1852

References

External links
 The Society of the Hawley Family, Inc.
 Colonial Connecticut Records: The Public Records of the Colony of Connecticut, 1636-1776
 The USGenWeb Project, Fairfield County

1726 births
1799 deaths
Continental Army officers from Connecticut
People from Trumbull, Connecticut
People of colonial Connecticut